Quarshie is a surname. Notable people with the surname include:

 Emmanuel Quarshie (1953–2013), Ghanaian footballer
 Hugh Quarshie, Ghanaian-born British actor
 Michael Quarshie (born 1979), Finnish American football player
 Tetteh Quarshie (1842–1892), Ghanaian agriculturalist